St. Joseph School of Industrial Trades is a Catholic secondary trade school founded in Dhaka, Bangladesh in 1954 by the Congregation of Holy Cross.

Location On Google Maps

References

External links

Christianity in Dhaka
Holy Cross secondary schools
Congregations of Holy Cross
Catholic secondary schools in Bangladesh
Schools in Dhaka District
Educational institutions established in 1954
1954 establishments in East Pakistan